Melville Lance Cooke (30 May 1934 – 5 September 2013) was a New Zealand rugby league player who represented New Zealand twenty three times between 1959 and 1964.

Playing career
Cooke was a member of the Hornby club in the Canterbury Rugby League competition. He was the player-coach when Hornby made the national tournament finals in 1962 and 1964 and when they won the Thacker Shield in 1964.

A Canterbury and South Island representative, in 1962 Cooke was captain of the first Canterbury team to win the Northern Union Cup from Auckland at the Addington Showgrounds.

Cooke played in 23 games for New Zealand, including at the 1960 World Cup. He played in eighteen consecutive tests between 1960 and 1964. Cooke was the captain for the last three seasons before accepting a player-coach position in Canberra in 1965.

Coaching career
Cooke took up a player-coach position with Monaro in 1965. While there he captained the side against the 1966 British Lions and was selected for New South Wales Country.

In 1969 Cooke returned to Hornby as coach. He was a Canterbury selector and coach in 1971 and again coached Hornby in 1978.

Legacy
Cooke was named one of New Zealand Rugby League's "Legends of League" in 1995.

In 2009 Cooke was named in the NZRL's team of the century.

Cooke died in September 2013, aged 79.

References

1934 births
2013 deaths
New Zealand rugby league administrators
New Zealand rugby league players
Canterbury rugby league team players
New Zealand national rugby league team players
New Zealand rugby league coaches
Country New South Wales rugby league team players
Canterbury rugby league team coaches
Hornby Panthers players
New Zealand national rugby league team captains
South Island rugby league team players
Rugby league locks
Rugby league halfbacks